The Project 690 Kefal ("Mullet") class (known in the West by its NATO reporting name Bravo class) was a design of military submarines that were built in the Soviet Union. The boats were designed for use in ASW exercises, but could also be employed in a combat role. Four vessels were built, which were commissioned into the Soviet Navy between 1967 and 1970. All four boats were stricken in the 1990s.

External links

 FAS page about Project 690
 GlobalSecurity page about Project 690
 deepstorm.ru Project 690 (ru)

Russian and Soviet navy submarine classes